is a throw in judo and is categorized as a foot technique, Ashi-waza.  It is one of the techniques adopted later by the Kodokan into their Shinmeisho No Waza (newly accepted techniques) list.

Description 
Uke attacks Tori with right hane goshi, as he does so Tori counters by hooking his left leg around Uke's lower left leg and reaps it to the right.

Alternatively, Tori lifts Uke up and reaps both his legs to the left with his right leg.  Similar to harai goshi gaeshi, the counter to the sweeping hip throw.

See also
The Canon Of Judo

References

External links 
 Information on the Techniques of Judo.
 Judo Techniques by type.

Judo technique
Throw (grappling)
Grappling hold
Grappling positions
Martial art techniques